Maruthi Ram Akella (born 1972) is an Indian-American aerospace engineer. Akella specializes in the control of complex dynamical systems that are subject to large scale nonlinearities and uncertainties.

Early life and education
Akella was born in 1972. He received his B.Tech. degree in Mechanical Engineering from the National Institute of Technology, Calicut and his M.E. degree in aerospace engineering from the Indian Institute of Science in 1994 and later received his Ph.D. degree in aerospace engineering from Texas A&M University in 1998. Akella was later recognized by  Texas A&M Aerospace Alumni Academy as an Outstanding Young Aerospace Engineer in 2015.

Career
Upon completing his formal education, Akella joined the faculty of the Cockrell School of Engineering in 1999. At the beginning of his tenure at Cockrell, he studied hummingbirds but became more interested in the hummingbird's sensory abilities than their speed. As an assistant professor, he was named an associate fellow of the American Institute of Aeronautics and Astronautics (AIAA) for his "outstanding contributions to aerospace attitude dynamics, control theory and networked systems." In 2008, Akella and colleague Dongeun Seo published their findings on spacecraft attitude tracking control without the use of rate-gyros which reduces the number of sensors that are required to track any rotating space object.

Akella returned to his early hummingbird research in 2015 and collaborated with the government of Austin, Texas in pioneering search and rescue work. At UV, he led a research team to create drones that could move quickly with spatial awareness that did not require a Global Positioning System or human operator. Akella's research was recognized by the United States Department of Defense who interested in larger models of the UAV teams’ drones. Akella was also named the winner of the Institute of Electrical and Electronics Engineers's (IEEE) Judith A. Resnik Award for "outstanding contributions in nonlinear dynamics and adaptive attitude control of complex space systems." He also collaborated with the NASA Johnson Space Center on the Seeker Robotic External CubeSat Inspection Vehicle DTO that could help make space travel safer for astronauts and the spacecraft that transport them.

In 2017, Akella was selected as an IEEE Distinguished Lecturer to represent the Aerospace and Electronic Systems Society. Following this, he was appointed the editor-in-chief of the Journal of the Astronautical Sciences after working there for several years as an American Astronautical Society Associate Editor.

During the COVID-19 pandemic, Akella was elected to the International Academy of Astronautics as a corresponding member for his research in the control of complex dynamical systems that are subject to large scale nonlinearities and uncertainties. He was also recognized by the IEEE with the 2020 Award for Technical Excellence in Aerospace Control for "significant contributions to learning and adaptive control for aerospace applications." In 2021, Akella was selected to receive the Dirk Brouwer Award by the American Astronautical Society for "seminal contributions to learning and adaptive control for spaceflight applications."

References

External links

Living people
1972 births
American aerospace engineers
Indian Institute of Science alumni
Texas A&M University alumni
University of Texas at Austin faculty
Fellows of the American Institute of Aeronautics and Astronautics
Academic journal editors